Piyare Lal Handoo (27 October 1927 – 27 January 2001) was an Indian politician and was a member of 6th Lok Sabha. He was also a Lawyer, Political and Social Worker, Teacher; participated in freedom struggle.  He was elected to 9th Lok Sabha from Anantnag. Member, Provincial Working Committee, Democratic National Conference, Jammu and Kashmir, for 2 years, Member, Working Committee NC, Jammu and Kashmir, for 9 years;  He was the Law and Revenue Minister in the cabinet of Dr Farooq Abdullah.

Committee Experience:  Chairman, Committee on Public Accounts and Committee on Public Undertakings, Jammu and Kashmir, Legislative Assembly for two years each; Member, various Joint Committees, Jammu and Kashmir, Legislative Assembly from time to time; Member, Committee on Environment and Forests, June 7, 1990 and Consultative Committee, Ministry of Home Affairs, 1990. 
Publications:  A thesis on George Bernard Shaw and his Political Plays (Thesis submitted for M.A. Examination);

Delegation to Foreign Countries:  Member, IPD to CPA Conference at Canada, 1977;

Social Activities:  Rendered assistance in rural development and in destitute widows welfare;

Other Information:  Member, Debt Conciliation Board, Land Laws Committee and Cooperative Loans Committee;

Major Contributions: THE JAMMU AND KASHMIR MIGRANT IMMOVABLE PROPERTY (PRESERVATION, PROTECTION AND RESTRAINT ON DISTRESS SALES ACT) 1997.

References

1927 births
2016 deaths
India MPs 1989–1991
Jammu & Kashmir National Conference politicians
People from Anantnag
Lok Sabha members from Jammu and Kashmir
Indian people of Kashmiri descent
Kashmiri people
Kashmiri Hindus
Kashmiri Pandits
Jammu and Kashmir MLAs 1983–1986
Jammu and Kashmir MLAs 1977–1983